Paul Albert Fino (December 15, 1913 – June 16, 2009) was an American lawyer and politician from New York. A member of the Republican Party, he served as a New York State Senator, a member of the United States House of Representatives and a justice of the New York Supreme Court.

Early life
Fino was born on December 15, 1913, in the Bronx to Isidore and Lucia Fino. He graduated from St. John's University School of Law in 1937.

Legislative career
He ran unsuccessfully for the New York State Assembly in 1940 and the New York State Senate in 1942. In 1944, Fino ran in the 27th district and defeated the Minority Leader of the State Senate, John J. Dunnigan. He represented the 27th from 1945 to 1950, sitting in the 165th, 166th and 167th New York State Legislatures.

In 1952, he defeated Bernard O'Connell to win a seat in the 83rd Congress. He went on to win seven more terms, serving in the 84th, 85th, 86th, 87th, 88th, 89th and 90th United States Congresses, holding office from January 3, 1953, until his resignation on December 31, 1968.

In Congress, Fino leaned conservative and opposed racial busing and abortion. However, Fino voted in favor of the Civil Rights Acts of 1957, 1960, 1964, and 1968, as well as the 24th Amendment to the U.S. Constitution and the Voting Rights Act of 1965. He championed the creation of a "national lottery," which he believed would allow the federal government to raise additional revenue to fund crucial programs without raising taxes. At one point, he introduced a bill to outlaw the Communist Party.  His positions also included support for traditionally liberal programs such as Medicare (he favored national health insurance), Social Security, and mass transit. In 1964, he proposed changes to the Social Security that would allow recipients to draw benefits at age 60 with no income limits. This was more generous than what the Democratic Party proposed.

Fino became an opponent of John Lindsay when the two served in Congress. After Lindsay became the Mayor of New York City in 1966, Fino continued to feud with him. The New York Times reported that Fino asked Lindsay for the appointment of a law partner as sanitation commissioner and was denied by the new mayor. Afterwards, he criticized Lindsay's more liberal legislative initiatives and mocked him for promoting New York as "Fun City". Lindsay countered by tacitly supporting efforts to remove Fino as the Bronx Republican leader.

He was a delegate to the 1960, 1964 and 1968 Republican National Conventions. From 1961 to 1968, he was also the Republican leader in The Bronx.

In 1961 Fino ran unsuccessfully for City Council president together with Louis J. Lefkowitz, who ran against Mayor Robert F. Wagner. The ticket included John J. Gilhooley of Brooklyn, a former assistant secretary of labor, for city comptroller, thus producing the ethnic trifecta of an Italian, a Jew and an Irishman. It is mainly remembered for the memorable campaign jingle which included:
  Let's make a note
  To get out and vote
  For Lefkowitz, Gilhooley and Fino

Later career
Fino won election to a newly created seat on the New York Supreme Court in 1968, and resigned from Congress on December 31; his seat was next filled by Mario Biaggi.

Fino served on the Court until 1972 and built a reputation for tough sentencing. In one case, he sentenced an addict to 30 years in prison for possession of 1/73 of an ounce of heroin.

On December 31, 1972, he resigned from the bench in order to run for a seat on the New York City Council. He stated at the time that a goal of returning to politics was to push out State Senator John D. Calandra from his post as the Bronx Republican leader. Fino lost in the Republican primary election to Pasquale Mele.

Later life
In 1986, Fino published his autobiography, My Life in Politics and Public Service.

He was a resident of Atlantic Beach, New York, when he died on June 16, 2009, in North Woodmere, New York.  He was buried at the Woodlawn Cemetery in the Bronx.

References

Sources
 
 

1913 births
2009 deaths
Lawyers from New York City
Republican Party New York (state) state senators
New York Supreme Court Justices
People from Atlantic Beach, New York
Burials at Woodlawn Cemetery (Bronx, New York)
Republican Party members of the United States House of Representatives from New York (state)
20th-century American politicians
20th-century American judges
Politicians from the Bronx
20th-century American lawyers